Rogne may refer to:

People
Thomas Rogne (born 1990), a Norwegian professional footballer who plays for Swedish club Helsingborgs IF

Places
Rogne, Gran, a village area in Gran Municipality in Innlandet county, Norway
Rogne, Innlandet, a village in Øystre Slidre Municipality in Innlandet county, Norway
Rogne Church, a church in the village of Rogne in Øystre Slidre Municipality in Innlandet county, Norway